Abdul Ghafoor Ahmed (Urdu: عبدالغفور احمد ; ‎ 26 June 1927 – 26 December 2012) was a Pakistani politician who represented Jamaat-e-Islami in National Assembly and Senate of Pakistan in 1970 till 1977. He was a signatory and committee member who prepared the draft of the 1973 Constitution of Pakistan.

Early life and education

Ahmed was born on 26 June 1927 to a Muslim family in Bareilly, British India. He received his early education in his hometown and then earned a master's degree  in commerce from University of Lucknow in 1948. After the Partition of India, his family moved to Pakistan where he started his career as politician and finished Industrial Accounts course and won fellowship of Institute of Cost and Management Accountants of Pakistan.

Political career

At the age of 23 Ahmed joined Jamaat-e-Islami as member of youth wing in 1950 after eight years he was elected as the member of the Karachi Metropolitan Corporation (KMC) in 1958. Like Wahiduddin Khan, Naeem Siddiqui, Israr Ahmad, Javed Ahmad Ghamidi and Khurshid Ahmad, Ahmad also worked closely with Syed Abul Ala Maududi (alternative spelling Syed Maudoodi; often referred to as Maulana Maududi) (1903–1979).

Ahmed was elected twice as member of National Assembly of Pakistan in 1970 and 1977. He participated as signatory and member of National Assembly's drafting committee for the Constitution of Pakistan in 1973. While his second tenure he showed his strong opposition against Zulfiqar Ali Bhutto, then Prime Minister of Pakistan by leading two political alliances named as United Democratic Alliance (UDA) and Pakistan National Alliance (PNA) respectively as general secretary in 1977 till 1978.

Ahmed also remained as senator and appointed as Federal Minister for Industries and Production in 1978 till 1979. He again worked as General secretary of Islami Jamhoori Ittehad (Islamic Democratic Alliance) which was a conservative alliance by several small religious political parties whose major goal was to oppose the Pakistan Peoples Party in elections of that year. Before his death he was serving as Naib Ameer of Jamaat-e-Islami. He was also an author of five books.

Death

Ahmed died at Patel Hospital in Karachi on Wednesday 26 December 2012 at the age of 85. He was suffering from protracted illness for several months and hospitalised for past 10 days. He is survived by three sons and six daughters.

Funeral

Ahmed's funeral took place in Karachi. Jamaat-e-Islami Ameer Syed Munawar Hasan led the funeral prayers which was attended by hundreds of party workers along with top leadership of known political parties of Pakistan such as Jamaat-e-Islami, Pakistan Muslim League, Pakistan Peoples Party and Muttahida Qaumi Movement. He was buried in Sakhi Hasan graveyard in Karachi. On his death several condolence messages were sent to his family by President Asif Zardari, Prime Minister Pervez Ashraf, Abdul Qadir Patel, Asfandyar Wali Khan, Imran Khan, Nawaz Sharif and Altaf Hussain.

See also
 Naeem Siddiqui
 Sayyid Abul Ala Maududi
 University of Lucknow
 Constitution of Pakistan

References

External links
 Prof Ghafoor Ahmed's Profile on Jamaat-e-Islami's Website
 Jamaat-e-Islami's Official Website

1927 births
2012 deaths
People from Bareilly
Muhajir people
Jamaat-e-Islami Pakistan politicians
Members of the Senate of Pakistan
Pakistani educators
Politicians from Karachi
University of Lucknow alumni